03:34: Earthquake in Chile is a 2011 Chilean film directed by Juan Pablo Ternicier and written by Mateo Iribarren. The film narrates three different stories based on the 2010 Chile earthquake.

The movie premiered in Dichato, Biobío Region, on February 27, 2011, exactly one year after the catastrophe, and was released throughout the rest of Chile on March 3. The first teaser for "03:34" was released on January 17, 2011.

Filming began in November 2010 in the same locations where the earthquake occurred, with the support of the National Council of Culture and the Arts and Carabineros de Chile, who helped with the recording in the affected zones. The movie had a budget of $1.4 million, and all profits from the movie were to be donated towards the construction of schools in the most affected coastal zones.

Plot 

The movie portrays three stories of people who were affected by the disaster.

The first story follows a woman (Andrea Freund), who travels from Pichilemu in the O'Higgins Region to the devastated town of Dichato in the Biobío Region to find her sons, who were spending their vacation with their father Manuel (Marcelo Alonso) in the area.

The second story depicts the experience of a convict (Fernando Gómez-Revira), who escapes from the Chillán Prison to Concepción because his daughter was in the Alto Río building, which collapsed during the earthquake.

The third story takes place in Dichato, where a group of young people (played by Loreto Aravena, Eduardo Paxeco, and Andrés Reyes) are enjoying their last day of vacation at a party when they experience the strong earthquake and tsunami that devastate the town.

Cast

 Andrea Freund
 Marcelo Alonso
 Loreto Aravena
 Roberto Farías
 Hugo Medina
 Fernando Gómez-Rovira
 Eduardo Paxeco
 Andrés Reyes
 Gabriela Medina
 Berta Lasala
 Remigio Remedy
 María Paz Jorquera
 Jorge Alís
 Jose Luis Bouchon
 Nathalia Aragonese
 Claudio Castellón
 Ernesto Anacona
 Julio Fuentes

References

External links
  

2011 films
Films about earthquakes
2010 Chile earthquake
2010s Spanish-language films
2011 thriller drama films
Films set in Pichilemu
Films set in 2010
Chilean thriller drama films
2010s Chilean films